Linden Community School District is a public school district in Genesee County in the U.S. state of Michigan and in the Genesee Intermediate School District.

High school

Athletics

In 2008, the Linden Eagles Cross Country team won the MHSAA DIV II Cross Country meet, becoming the first sports team to win a state championship in the school's history.

References

External links
lindenschools.org

School districts in Michigan
Education in Genesee County, Michigan